The 2014 Sylvania 300 was a NASCAR Sprint Cup Series stock car race that was held on September 21, 2014, at New Hampshire Motor Speedway in Loudon, New Hampshire. Contested over 303 laps, it was the 28th race of the 36 2014 NASCAR Sprint Cup Series season and second race of the ten race Chase for the Sprint Cup. Joey Logano scored his seventh career victory. Kyle Larson finished second while Kevin Harvick, Jamie McMurray, and Jimmie Johnson rounded out the top five. The top rookies of the race were Kyle Larson (2nd), Austin Dillon (11th), and Justin Allgaier (20th).

Winner's Words After Previous Weeks Win
Brad Keselowski coasted on to victory lane on the final restart in the MyAFibStory.com 400 at Chicagoland Speedway. “I am not really sure what to say,’’ Keselowski said after scoring his second consecutive victory of the season. “I don’t really know what happened. I just know we got to the lead. I saw Kyle and Kevin racing each other really hard, they were aggressively side drafting and I was waiting for an opportunity to strike and it came. The car stuck and everything came together."

Report

Background
New Hampshire Motor Speedway is a 1.058-mile (1.703 km) oval speedway located in Loudon, New Hampshire which has hosted NASCAR racing annually since the early 1990s, as well as an IndyCar weekend and the oldest motorcycle race in North America, the Loudon Classic. Nicknamed "The Magic Mile", the speedway is often converted into a 1.6-mile (2.6 km) road course, which includes much of the oval.

On September 16, Ontario Country District Attorney Michael Tantillo issued a written statement stating that the findings into the investigation of the Tony Stewart incident at Canandaigua Motorsports Park on August 9 would be sent to a grand jury to determine what chargers if any will be filed against Stewart. The statement reads as follows. “Over the past several weeks, I have reviewed with members of the Ontario County Sheriff’s Department their investigation, as it progressed, in the Tony Stewart matter. Recently that office concluded its work and forwarded the complete case file to me. Upon my review of all of the information contained in the entire investigation, I have made the determination that it would be appropriate to submit the evidence to a grand jury, for their determination as to what action should be taken in this matter. Accordingly, the evidence developed in the investigation will be presented to an Ontario County grand jury in the near future.
“As grand jury proceedings in New York State are strictly confidential by law, I am unable to state when the matter will be scheduled, other than to state that I intend to present the matter in the near future. Similarly, because of the confidential nature of these proceedings, I cannot state who will be called as witnesses, or what any witness’s expected testimony will be. When the presentation has been completed and a determination has been made, I will advise the public and the media at that time of the results.”

Stewart said he would continue to cooperate in the grand jury proceeding. "I respect the time and effort spent by both the Ontario County District Attorney and the sheriff’s office in investigating this tragic accident," Stewart said in a statement. "I look forward to this process being completed, and I will continue to provide my full cooperation.” Stewart is expected to race this weekend and NASCAR has issued a statement allowing him to do so. "We are aware of the completed investigation and the announced next steps," NASCAR spokesman Brett Jewkes said in a statement. "First, our thoughts continue to be with all who have been impacted by this tragedy. We will monitor this process and stay in close contact with Stewart-Haas Racing. It would be inappropriate for NASCAR to comment on this case so we will continue to respect the process and authorities involved."

Also on September 16, BK Racing sidelined Ryan Truex and put Travis Kvapil in the No. 83 car. This was a decision made quietly and wasn't announced till Friday, September 19. No reason was given as to why this happened and the team has not announced the immediate future beyond this weekend. “I didn’t have anything going on this weekend,” Kvapil said. “We had talked about doing something with the 93. These are my guys here. I had been with them for the last two years and feel I had a hand in building this team. I don’t know what the plans are beyond this weekend, but it’s good to be back.”

Entry list
The entry list for the Sylvania 300 was released on Monday, September 15, 2014 at 10:01 a.m. Eastern time. Forty-three drivers were entered for the race.

Practice

First practice

Qualifying

I’m ready to get running tomorrow and hopefully, we’ll get another win. I try not to get caught up in statements, I’m just trying to go out there and do our job. The Penske team has done phenomenal this season, and it’s great to keep it rolling." “I thought we had a really good car in race trim,” said Jamie McMurray who qualified second. “We ran a few laps in race trim to start today. Very similar to the same car we had here the first race. We switched over to qualifying trim we were second quick so yeah our car has been good so far. The track will change a little bit tomorrow when the rubber gets laid down, but overall it’s been a really good weekend so far.” “We qualified a lot better this time than we did the last trip here,” said Dale Earnhardt Jr. “We saved a set of tires in practice too that will be a big benefit tomorrow in race trim. It was a good day.” Forty-three drivers were entered so no one failed to make the race.

Qualifying results

Practice (post-qualifying)

Second practice

Final practice
Corey Lajoie, who was making his first Sprint Cup Series start, tagged the wall in turn 4. Greg Biffle spun out exiting turn 2. The only damage that was sustained was a flat right-rear tire. In the closing seconds of the session, Tony Stewart got loose coming off of turn 4 and spun sideways down the front stretch.

Race

Start

The race was scheduled to start at 2:16 p.m. Eastern time but started three minutes early with Brad Keselowski leading the way, the first caution of the race flew on lap 36, It was a planned competition caution due to overnight rain. Denny Hamlin took just two tires and assumed the lead after David Gilliland pitted after staying out. Keselowski took four and exited pit road 16th, The race restarted on lap 41.

Second half
Kevin Harvick took the lead on lap 71, Denny Hamlin was running second when he made an unscheduled stop for a fuel probe issue on lap 95.

Second Caution and restart
Debris brought out the second caution on lap 105. The debris was from a Z-MAX decal that was located on the backstretch wall past the exit of turn 2. A NASCAR official eventually removed the logo. Harvick and Joey Logano traded the lead on pit road because of where Harvick's pit stall was located, The race restarted on lap 113, Dale Earnhardt Jr. was running sixth when he made an unscheduled stop for a loose wheel.

Third Half
Debris in turn 3 brought out the third caution on lap 170. Harvick and Logano once again traded the lead on pit road. Only this time, Logano exited first. The race restarted on lap 178, Caution came out for the fourth time on lap 180 when Martin Truex Jr. got into Cole Whitt and spun out taking David Ragan with him. Denny Hamlin slid into Ragan trying to avoid him. "Unfortunately, in this three-race deal you can't make any mistakes," Hamlin said of the new elimination format, in which four drivers will be out of contention after every third race in the 10-race run to the title. "And we didn't. But a parts failure put us down." "I hate to say it, but maybe some guys get some trouble and let us back in it. Other than that, it's going to be hard for us to do it without some help."

Restart and big wreck
The race restarted on lap 187, Caution flew for the fifth time on lap 188 for another multi-car crash in turn 2. Matt Kenseth got loose exiting turn 2. He pancaked the front of Kyle Busch and that accordioned into Kasey Kahne and sent Busch spinning down the backstretch.

Fourth Half
The race restarted on lap 193 and caution flew for the sixth time on lap 194 when Brad Keselowski, racing for seventh with Kenseth, got loose and turned himself around in turn 2.

Restart
The race restarted on lap 198 and caution flew for the seventh time on lap 201 after Ricky Stenhouse Jr. got turned by a loose Dale Earnhardt Jr. exiting turn 4, The race restarted on lap 206, Caution flew for the eighth time on lap 211 for debris on the backstretch. Brian Vickers stayed out when the leaders pitted and assumed the lead, The race restarted with 85 laps to go.

Midway
Caution flew for the ninth time with 79 laps to go after Kurt Busch slammed the wall in turn 3 following blowing the right-front tire.

Halfway
The race restarted with 75 laps to go, Brad Keselowski retook the lead with 73 laps to go and Debris on the backstretch brought out the tenth caution of the race with 55 laps to go, The race restarted with 50 laps to go, Caution flew for the eleventh time with 44 laps to go after Corey LaJoie spun out in turn 2.

Twelfth caution and restart
The race restarted with 40 laps to go. Ricky Stenhouse Jr. slammed the wall in turn 1 to bring out the twelfth caution of the race with 37 laps to go.

Restart
The race restarted with 32 laps to go and Kevin Harvick immediately retook the lead from Brad Keselowski. Caution came out for the 13th time with 31 laps to go after Paul Menard got loose and spun in turn 3. He collected Matt Kenseth and hit the wall in turn 4.

Restart and 14th caution
The race restarted with 27 laps to go and Joey Logano retook the lead. Caution flew for the 14th time with nine laps to go after Jeff Gordon slammed the wall in turn 1.

Restart and 15th caution 
The race restarted with four laps to go. Caution flew for the 15th time with three laps to go after Tony Stewart got turned and spun exiting turn 4.

Green-white-checker finish

Attempt #1
Joey Logano took off on the first Green-White-Checker attempt to score his fourth victory of the season. “It feels good to go into the next one,” Logano said. “We’ve got to keep doing what we’re doing though. We’ve got to keep our eye on the prize and think about the big trophy at the end.”

Race results

Race statistics
 10 lead changes among different drivers
 15 cautions for 63 laps
 Time of race: 3:14:53
 Joey Logano won his fourth race in 2014

Media

Television

Radio

Standings after the race

Drivers' Championship standings

Manufacturers' Championship standings

Note: Only the first sixteen positions are included for the driver standings.

References

Osram Sylvania 300
Osram Sylvania 300
Osram Sylvania 300
NASCAR races at New Hampshire Motor Speedway